Edward Fitzgerald or FitzGerald may refer to:

Government and politics 
 Edward Fitzgerald (1529-90), MP for Great Grimsby and Lichfield
 Edward FitzGerald (Inistioge MP) (1689), MP for Inistioge
 Edward FitzGerald (1738–1814), Irish politician, MP for Clare 1776–90 and for Castlebar 1790–97
 Lord Edward FitzGerald (1763–1798), Irish revolutionary
 Edward Fitzgerald (insurgent) (1770?–1807), Irish revolutionary
 Edward Fitzgerald Beale (1822–1893), American naval officer, frontiersman and diplomat
 Sir Edward Fitzgerald, 1st Baronet (1846–1827), Lord Mayor of Cork
 Edward FitzGerald, 7th Duke of Leinster (1892–1976)
 Ed FitzGerald (born 1968), American politician
 Edward Fitzgerald (adviser), American adviser to Senator Claude Pepper
 Edward Fitzgerald (barrister), English barrister
 Edward Fitzgerald (Texas politician), see Texas Senate, District 19

Sport 
 Edward FitzGerald (mountaineer) (1871–1931), leader of first group to climb Aconcagua
 Eddie Fitzgerald (athlete) (1888–1936), American Olympic athlete
 Edward Fitzgerald (ice hockey) (1891–1966), American ice hockey player
 Edward E. Fitzgerald (1919–2001), sports writer, editor of Sport magazine, chief executive of Book of the Month Club
 Ed Fitz Gerald (1924–2020), American baseball player
 Edward Fitzgerald (fencer) (born 1997), Australian fencer who competed in the 2014 Summer Youth Olympics
 Edward Fitzgerald (sailor) (fl. 2018–2020), World Championships medalist in sailing

Other fields 
 Edward FitzGerald (poet) (1809–1883), English writer, translator of the Rubaiyat of Omar Khayyam
 Edward Fitzgerald (brewer) (1820–1896), Australian brewer
 Edward Fitzgerald (bishop) (1833–1907), second bishop of the Roman Catholic Diocese of Little Rock
 Edward Fitzgerald (priest) (1883–1968) was an Irish Roman Catholic priest
 Edward Aloysius Fitzgerald (1893–1972), fourth bishop of the Roman Catholic Diocese of Winona
 Edward FitzGerald (born 1988), heir presumptive of Maurice FitzGerald, 9th Duke of Leinster
 Eddie Fitzgerald (artist), writer and artist for The Ren & Stimpy Show

See also
 Eddie Fitzgerald (athlete)
 Edward FitzGerald-Villiers
 James Edward Fitzgerald (disambiguation)
 Lady Edward FitzGerald
 Ed Fitz Gerald
 Edmund Fitzgerald (disambiguation)